KMD Brands, formerly Kathmandu Holdings, is a global outdoor, lifestyle and sports company consisting of three brands: Kathmandu, Rip Curl and Oboz.

Kathmandu was founded in 1987 in New Zealand and specialises in clothing and equipment for travel and the outdoors. Oboz, part of the group since 2018, is based in North America and designs wilderness footwear. Rip Curl, acquired in 2019, is a global surf brand founded in Bells Beach, Australia in 1969.

History

Kathmandu was founded by John Pawson and Jan Cameron in 1987 following their sale of the ALP Sports Clothing label. The company set up its first retail outlets in Australia, whilst manufacturing most of its original clothing range in New Zealand. Bernard Wicht, owner of Alpine Accoutrements, had been the main manufacturer for ALP Sports but continued to manufacture for Kathmandu and also partnered with Penny Hazard to set up the Bivouac chain of stores in New Zealand. In 1992 Kathmandu, having established a strong operation in Australia (with stores in Sydney, Melbourne, Brisbane and Canberra) re-entered the New Zealand retail marketplace, purchasing Alps Sports from its receivers and brought in Bernard Wicht to join John Pawson and Jan Cameron as a third shareholder.

In 2006, Quadrant Private Equity bought the company for NZ$275 million, after Cameron had previously sold half of her business. Wicht was the owner of both the Fairydown and Macpac brands until 2015.

Kathmandu was listed on the Australian and New Zealand stock exchanges in November 2009. From 2017 to 2019, Kathmandu had naming rights for the Coast to Coast race in New Zealand.

Kathmandu announced the purchase of Oboz Footwear in March 2018. Oboz is an outdoor footwear brand based in Montana, U.S. Its marketing stresses sustainability and product innovation, such as through its support for like Trees for the Future and Small Woods, which both advocate for sustainable forestry.

In February 2019, Kathmandu launched a series with National Geographic, called Eco Traveller, which focuses on eco-friendly travel and sustainable tourism. Eco Traveller is hosted by Nick Saxon from National Geographic.

In October 2019, Kathmandu announced it would buy 100% of Australian surf brand Rip Curl for A$350m.

In March 2022, Kathmandu Holdings was rebranded KMD Brands.

Wage subsidy controversy
Like other businesses operating in New Zealand, Kathmandu received sizeable financial support from the New Zealand government in the form of wage subsidies for its employees across New Zealand. This was part of a wider policy of economic stimulus for large and small businesses following the COVID-19 outbreak and the resulting downturn in the economy. As part of this programme, Kathmandu Group received $6.2 million from New Zealand taxpayers in 2020. However, despite subsequently posting a profit of NZ $31.5 million, Kathmandu management refused to repay the funds even though the company had enjoyed a profitable year. This decision was condemned on both sides of the political spectrum in New Zealand with the two major parties describing it as unfair. Kathmandu's decision was also labelled as an example of the "waste" and "fraud" in the wage subsidy scheme treasury had earlier warned of.

References

External links

 Kathmandu NZ (New Zealand website)
 Kathmandu AU (Australia website)
 Kathmandu UK (UK website)
 Kathmandu International (US website)
 Kathmandu Holdings (Investor website)

Retail companies of Australia
Retail companies of New Zealand
Companies listed on the Australian Securities Exchange
Companies listed on the New Zealand Exchange
New Zealand brands
Outdoor clothing brands
Sporting goods retailers
Retail companies established in 1987
Companies based in Christchurch
Sporting goods retailers of Australia
New Zealand companies established in 1987